Kim Michael Splidsboel (born 25 November 1955) is a Danish football manager and former professional player who played as a sweeper. He was most recently the manager of Danish 2nd Division side, BK Avarta.

Playing career
Splidsboel played professionally for Hvidovre IF and Herfølge BK.

Coaching career
Splidsboel has managed Denmark U16, Hvidovre IF, Brøndby IF U23, Holbæk B&I, Dragør BK, Malawi, Værløse BK, and FC Banants from August 2008 to October 2008.

He was named manager of B 1908 from January 2010. He left the club at the end of his contract on 31 December 2011.

On 30 April 2012, Splidsboel was brought in as manager of B93 in order to save the club from relegation. He left the club following the 2013–14-season. In January 2015 he became new manager of BK Avarta. He was sacked a few months later and replaced by Benny Gall.

References

1955 births
Living people
Danish men's footballers
Footballers from Copenhagen
Association football sweepers
Hvidovre IF players
Herfølge Boldklub players
Danish football managers
Holbæk B&I managers
Malawi national football team managers
FC Urartu managers
Boldklubben af 1893 managers
BK Avarta managers
Danish expatriate football managers
Expatriate football managers in Malawi
Expatriate football managers in Armenia
Danish 1st Division players